Christian Island 30 is a First Nations reserve located on Christian Island in Georgian Bay, in Ontario. It is one of the reserves of the Beausoleil First Nation.

Beausoleil First Nation have resided on the island since 1856.

References

Anishinaabe reserves in Ontario
Municipalities in Simcoe County